The ET 25 was a series of electric multiple units built in the 1930s by the Deutsche Reichsbahn-Gesellschaft.

History 
Some of the trains were used after World War II by the Deutsche Bundesbahn of West Germany, where they would be renamed to Class 425 in 1968. The last units were decommissioned in 1985; two units went to the DB Museum.

ET 25
ET 25
15 kV AC multiple units